Marinifilaceae  is a family in the order Marinilabiliales.

References

Further reading 
 

Bacteroidia